David L. Farabee is a former member of the Texas House of Representatives. He represented Wichita Falls for six terms, beginning with his first electoral victory in 1998.

Background
Despite Wichita Falls being a strongly conservative district, David Farabee won his races as a Democrat, primarily based on name recognition. His father Ray Farabee was an attorney who served in the Texas Senate and as general counsel for the University of Texas System.

In 2007, the Austin Chronicle named Farabee and fellow legislator Joe Hefling as "the most conservative Dems" in the legislature.

References 

Living people
Democratic Party members of the Texas House of Representatives
Year of birth missing (living people)